Now You See Me may refer to:

 "Now You See Me", a 1986 story by Sheri Lee Morton, appearing in Shadows
 "Now You See Me", a 1996 episode of 7th Heaven
 Now You See Me, a 2002 novel by Tina Wainscott
 "Now You See Me...", an episode of Harry and His Bucket Full of Dinosaurs
 Now You See Me, a 2009 graphic novel by Glen Downey
 "Now You See Me", a song from the 2010 album Does It Look Like I'm Here? by Emeralds
 Now You See Me (film series)
 Now You See Me (film), a 2013 heist film
 Now You See Me 2, the 2016 sequel
 "Now You See Me", a 2019 mystery novel by Chris McGeorge

See also 
 Now You See Me, Now You Don't (disambiguation)
 Now You See It, Now You Don't (disambiguation)
 Now You See It (disambiguation)